Eriksmoen is a surname. Notable people with the surname include:

Ashley Eriksmoen, American-born Australia-based furniture maker, woodworker, artist, and educator
Snefrid Eriksmoen (1894–1954), Norwegian politician